Kruesi is a surname. Notable people with the surname include:

Frank Kruesi, American public transportation official
John Kruesi (1843–1899), Swiss-born American machinist 
Mary Alice Kruesi, pseudonym for author Mary Alice Monroe